Salzburg is a city in Austria.

Salzburg may also refer to:

Places

Austria
Salzburg (state), a federal state of Austria
Duchy of Salzburg
Archbishopric of Salzburg, 1278 – 1803
Hohensalzburg Fortress in Salzburg, Austria

Germany
Salzburg Castle, in Franconia, Germany
Salzburg, Germany, a municipality in Rhineland-Palatinate, Germany
A part of Neufahrn in Niederbayern in Bavaria, Germany

Other places
Ocna Sibiului, Romania
Château-Salins, France

Other uses
FC Red Bull Salzburg, an Austrian football club based in Wals-Siezenheim
Salzburg Protestants, exiled in the 1700s
Salzburger emigrants to Georgia, now in the USA
Honduras Salzburg, a Honduran football club

See also
Salzberg (disambiguation)
Saltzberg, a surname
Saltsburg, Pennsylvania